FC FSHM Moscow is a Russian football team from Moscow. It played professionally from 1979 to 1996. FShM stands for "Football School of Youth" (Futbolnaya Shkhola Molodyozhi) and during Soviet times many junior players from Moscow played on the team to gain their initial professional experience. Their best result was 10th place in Zone 1 of the Soviet Second League in 1986. It plays in the Russian Amateur Football League which have a semi-pro status.

Team name history
 1950–1984: FShM Moscow
 1985–1986: SK FShM Moscow
 1987–1989: SK EShVSM Moscow
 1990–1991: FC Zvezda Moscow
 1992–1998: FC TRASKO Moscow
 1999–present: FC FSHM Moscow

External links
  Team history at KLISF

Association football clubs established in 1950
Defunct football clubs in Moscow
1950 establishments in Russia